Jeremy Mortimer is a British director and producer of radio dramas for BBC Radio. He won the 2012 Bronze Sony Radio Academy Award for Best Drama with A Tale of Two Cities.

Life
Jeremy Mortimer is the son of Sir John Mortimer and Penelope Mortimer and the half-brother of Emily Mortimer.

Mortimer's credits include The Pattern of Painful Adventures (BBC Radio 3, 2008) and radio adaptations of Daphnis and Chloe (BBC Radio 4, 2006), Philomel Cottage (Radio 4, 2002) and The Time Machine (Radio 3, 2009). His production of the Troy Trilogy, which featured Paul Scofield and was first broadcast on Radio 3 in 1998, was lauded as "the greatest radio drama [anyone] could ever hear."

Radio Plays

Notes:

Sources:
 Jeremy Mortimer's radio play listing at Diversity website
 Jeremy Mortimer's radio play listing at RadioListings website

References

BBC Radio drama directors
BBC radio producers
British radio producers
Place of birth missing (living people)
Living people
Year of birth missing (living people)
Jeremy